Luka Raković (born 6 June 1988) is a Croatian handball player who plays for Grand Nancy Métropole HB. A Croatian international, Raković was runner-up at the 2010 European Men's Championship in Austria.

Clubs 
Born in Zagreb, Raković played for Croatian clubs Perutnina Pipo Cakovec, RK Bjelovar and RK Zagreb. He was a member of Bosnian club Bosna BH Gas, which reached the EHF Champions League last 16 of the 2010–11 season. With the latter he won the domestic league in 2011. In the summer 2012, he signed for Macedonian side RK Vardar Skopje. Two years later, he returned to RK Zagreb. In November 2016, he joined Portuguese side S.L. Benfica for one season.

Honours 
RK Zagreb
Premier League: 2009–10, 2014–15, 2015–16
Croatian Cup: 2010, 2015, 2016

Bosna Sarajevo
Premier League of Bosnia and Herzegovina: 2010–11

Vardar
Macedonian Super League: 2012–13
Macedonian Cup: 2014
SEHA League: 2013–14

References

External links 
 Profile at European Handball Federation
 Profile at EHF Champions League 2013–14
 Prole at Croatian Handball Federation

1988 births
Living people
Handball players from Zagreb
Croatian male handball players
RK Zagreb players
S.L. Benfica handball players
Expatriate handball players
Croatian expatriate sportspeople in Bosnia and Herzegovina
Croatian expatriate sportspeople in Portugal